Rafael Miguel Noble Magee (March 15, 1919 – May 8, 1998) was a Cuban catcher in the Negro leagues and Major League Baseball (MLB) who played professionally in the United States and his native country between 1945 and 1961.

After spending all or part of four seasons with the New York Cubans of the Negro National League and two years at the Triple-A level of minor league baseball, Noble was 32 years old when he broke into the big leagues on April 18, 1951 with the New York Giants. The rookie was the Giants' second-string catcher that season, starting 26 games behind the plate (workhorse Wes Westrum started 119). He batted .234 with 33 hits, five home runs and 26 runs batted in; all were career highs. During that pennant-winning season, Noble was in the Giants' lineup as their catcher during the ninth inning of Game 3 of the 1951 National League tie-breaker series, when Bobby Thomson hit his famous home run. Noble handled no chances defensively in his one inning of work, and did not get a chance to bat. In the 1951 World Series that followed, he appeared in two games as a pinch hitter and defensive replacement and was hitless in two at bats. In the field, he caught three total innings in relief of Westrum and earned an assist when he threw out Gil McDougald of the New York Yankees for a caught stealing in the eighth inning of Game 6.

Noble played for the Giants through the 1953 season, though he spent most of 1952 in the Open-Classification Pacific Coast League.  Altogether, in 107 MLB games, Noble collected 53 hits, including nine career homers, and batted .218.  His career continued at the top levels of minor league baseball through 1961.

Noble died at the age of 79 in Brooklyn, New York.

Further reading
Figueredo, Jorge S. Who’s Who in Cuban Baseball 1878-1961. Jefferson, North Carolina. McFarland & Company, Inc.: 2003.

Sources

External links
, or Retrosheet, or SABR Biography Project, or Liga Cubana de Béisbol Profesional (Spanish), or The Deadball Era

1919 births
1998 deaths
Buffalo Bisons (minor league) players
Cienfuegos players
Columbus Jets players
Habana players
Havana Sugar Kings players
Houston Buffs players
Jersey City Giants players
Major League Baseball catchers
Major League Baseball players from Cuba
Cuban expatriate baseball players in the United States
Minneapolis Millers (baseball) players
New York Cubans players
New York Giants (NL) players
Oakland Oaks (baseball) players
People from Santiago de Cuba Province
Burials at Cypress Hills Cemetery